Danube Banovina or Danube Banate, was a banovina (or province) of the Kingdom of Yugoslavia between 1929 and 1941. This province consisted of the geographical regions of Syrmia, Bačka, Banat, Baranya, Šumadija, and Braničevo. The capital city of the Danube Banovina was Novi Sad. The province was named after the Danube River.

Population
According to the 1931 census, the Danube Banovina had 2,387,495 inhabitants. The population of this region was composed of: 
 Serbs and Croats (56.9%)
 Hungarians (18.2%)
 Germans (16.3%)

Borders
According to the 1931 Constitution of the Kingdom of Yugoslavia, 
"The Danube Banovina is bounded on the south-west by the boundaries ... of the Sava and Drina Banovinas, on the north and north-east by the State frontiers with Hungary and Romania, up to the point where the latter frontier meets the Danube. The boundary then follows the course of the Danube up to the eastern boundary of the district of Ram and then turns along the south-eastern boundary of the Požarevac district. It then follows the eastern boundaries of the districts of Morava, Lepenica, Kragujevac, and Gruža, as far as the Dulenski Crni Vrh (hill 919), turning towards the Gledic Mountains and thence over the Krečane (hill 760) and Brzak (hill 822) up to the boundary of the Drina Banovina on Mount Kotlenik, near Crni Vrh (hill 768)."

History

In 1931, Mitrovica and Šid districts were transferred from Drina Banovina to Danube Banovina.

In 1939, when the new Banovina of Croatia was formed, Šid and Ilok districts were transferred from the Danube Banovina to that of Croatia.

In 1941, the World War II Axis Powers occupied the Danube Banovina. Bačka and Baranja regions were attached to Hungary, while Syrmia was attached to the Independent State of Croatia. The remainder of the former Danube Banovina (including Banat, Šumadija, and Braničevo) were part of the Territory of the Military Commander in Serbia. However, Banat had autonomy as a region ruled by its ethnic German minority.

In 1945 the region was restored as a province of Serbia within a federal Socialist Yugoslavia. The province was officially renamed as Vojvodina, its historical name, with the capital at the city of Novi Sad. The new province consisted of Syrmia, Banat and Bačka regions. Baranja was included in the People's Republic of Croatia, while Šumadija and Braničevo were included in Serbia Proper.

Cities
Some large cities of the Danube Banovina were:
 Novi Sad
 Subotica
 Petrovgrad (now Zrenjanin)
 Sombor
 Velika Kikinda (now Kikinda)
 Mitrovica (now Sremska Mitrovica)
 Kragujevac
 Smederevo
 Požarevac

Bans of Danube Banovina (1929–1941)
 Daka Popović (1929–1930)
 Radoslav Dunjić (1930)
 Svetomir Matić (1930–1931)
 Milan Nikolić (1931–1933)
 Dobrica Matković (1933–1935)
 Milojko Vasović (1935)
 Svetislav Paunović (1935–1936)
 Svetislav Rajić (1936–1939)
 Jovan Radivojević (1939–1940)
 Branko Kijurina (1940–1941)
 Milorad Vlaškalin (1941)

See also
Vojvodina

References and further reading

"Dunavska banovina", Enciklopedija Novog Sada, sveska 7, urednik Dr Dušan Popov, Novi Sad, 1996.
The Constitution of the Kingdom of Yugoslavia

Yugoslav Serbia
Yugoslav Croatia
20th century in Vojvodina
Banovinas of the Kingdom of Yugoslavia
History of Banat
History of Bačka
History of Syrmia
History of Baranya (region)
1929 establishments in Yugoslavia
1941 disestablishments in Yugoslavia